Ingstad may refer to:
 8993 Ingstad, a main-belt asteroid, named after Helge Ingstad
 Ingstad Family Media, a broadcasting company in North Dakota, United States

People 
 Helge Ingstad (1899–2001), a Norwegian explorer. 
 Marcus Pløen Ingstad (1837–1918), a Norwegian professor of law and legal scholar
 Anne Stine Ingstad (1918–1997), a Norwegian archaeologist and wife of Helge Ingstad
 Vilde Ingstad (born 1994), a Norwegian handball player